Eduard Marxsen (23 July 1806 – 18 November 1887) was a German pianist, composer and teacher.

Biography
Marxsen was born in Nienstädten. He was a pupil of Ignaz von Seyfried (a pupil of Mozart who conducted the premiere of the original version of Beethoven's Fidelio), Simon Sechter, Johann Heinrich Clasing, and Carl Maria von Bocklet (a close friend of  Beethoven and Schubert).

His most famous student was Johannes Brahms, who dedicated his Piano Concerto No. 2 in B-flat major, Op. 83 to Marxsen. 

He wrote about 70 works, including an orchestral work named Beethovens Schatten (Beethoven's Shadow), which was performed a number of times.

He died in Altona, aged 81.

Bibliography
 Jane Vial Jaffe: "Brahms as an Editor of Marxsen?", in: The American Brahms Society Newsletter, vol. 28 (2010), no. 1 (Spring 2010), p. 1-5.
 Jane Vial Jaffe: "The Symphonic Side of Eduard Marxsen", in: The American Brahms Society Newsletter, vol. 28 (2010), no. 2 (Fall 2010), p. 1-7.
 Jane Vial Jaffe: Eduard Marxsen and Brahms (Proquest database, Umi Dissertation Publishing, 2011).
 Page for Marxsen, mentioning a recording by Anthony Spiri of several of Marxsen's works for Piano, at prestoclassical.co.uk

References

External links

1806 births
1887 deaths
19th-century classical composers
19th-century classical pianists
19th-century German composers
German classical pianists
German music educators
Piano pedagogues
Pupils of Ignaz von Seyfried